The Extreme 40 is a class of sailing catamaran created by TornadoSport and designed by Yves Loday. The boats are 40 feet long and are constructed out of carbon fibre. They were sailed in the Extreme Sailing Series, formerly known as the iShares Cup. Extreme 40s are essentially a scaled-up version of the Tornado sailboat used in The Olympics. 

References

External links

https://web.archive.org/web/20121217004725/http://www.extreme40.org/

2000s sailboat type designs
Catamarans
Extreme Sailing Series